Pseudopenicillus is a genus of green algae in the family Udoteaceae.

References

Bryopsidales genera
Udoteaceae